The  was an advisory council to the Emperor of Japan that operated from 1888 to 1947. It was largely used to limit the power of the Imperial Diet.

Functions
Modeled in part upon the Privy Council of the United Kingdom, this body advised the Japanese Empire on matters including, but not limited to: 
 Proposed amendments to the Constitution of the Empire of Japan
 Proposed amendments to the 1889 Imperial Household Law
 Matters of constitutional interpretation, proposed laws, and ordinances
 Proclamations of martial law or declaration of war
 Treaties and other international agreements
 Matters concerning the succession to the throne
 Declarations of a regency under the Imperial Household Law;
 Matters submitted by the Emperor directly

The Privy Council had both judicial functions and certain executive functions. However, the council had no power to initiate legislation.

Establishment
To oversee new governmental developments, in 1871, three councils were created - the Council of the Left, Centre, and Right, who would be collectively known as the Council of the Elders (genrō in). The Elders oversaw the writing of the Meiji Constitution, and would become councilors in the Privy Council.

The Privy Council of Japan was established by an imperial ordinance of Emperor Meiji dated 28 April 1888, under the presidency of Itō Hirobumi, to deliberate on the draft constitution. The new constitution, which the emperor promulgated on 11 February 1889, briefly mentioned the Privy Council in Chapter 4, Article 56: "The Privy Councilors shall, in accordance with the provisions for the organization of the Privy Council, deliberate upon important matters of State when they have been consulted by the Emperor." 
 
The Privy Council consisted of a chairman, a vice chairman (non-voting), twelve (later expanded to twenty-four) councilors, a chief secretary, and three additional secretaries. All privy councilors including the president and the vice president were appointed by the Emperor for life, on the advice of the Prime Minister and the cabinet. In addition to the twenty-four voting privy counselors, the Prime Minister and the other ministers of state were ex officio members of the council. The princes of the imperial household (both the shinnōke and the ōke ) over the age of majority were permitted to attend meetings of the Privy Council and could participate in its proceedings.  The president was the authority as he called and controlled meetings inside of the council. The Council met in secret at the Tokyo Imperial Palace, with the Emperor in attendance on important occasions. The Council was empowered to deliberate on any matters upon which the Emperor desired an opinion.

Assessment
Theoretically, the Privy Council's legal power was extensive, but, like many other aspects of Meiji-era politics, the effective power of the Privy Council was largely based upon the genrō and other oligarchs. Masao Maruyama described the Council as an "irrational arrangement prevailed in which decisions depended on fortuitous human relations, psychological coercion by the Elder Statesmen [genro] and other ‘officials close to the Throne,’ shifts in the relative strength of cliques, deals among wire-pullers and bosses, assignation-house politics, and so forth."

During its early years, many members of the Privy Council were simultaneously members of the elected government; however in its later years, the Privy Council essentially replaced the genrō and the Genrōin as a very conservative “old boys” club, often at odds with the party-dominated elected government. After the Privy Council unsuccessfully challenged the government by attempting to reject several government decisions, and by attempting to assert itself on certain foreign policy issues, it was demonstrated that in actuality the balance of power was with the elected government.  The Privy Council was thenceforth largely ignored, and was not consulted on major policy matters, including the Attack on Pearl Harbor. 

The Privy Council was abolished with the enforcement of the current postwar Constitution of Japan on 3 May 1947.

Leadership

Presidents

Fifteen people served as the President of the Privy Council of Japan.

Vice presidents

See also
 Lord Keeper of the Privy Seal of Japan

Notes

References

 ; OCLC 44090600
; OCLC 145151778

1888 establishments in Japan
1947 disestablishments in Japan
Politics of the Empire of Japan
Japan